Georgina Frances de Peyronnet (15 April 1815 – 8 July 1895) was a British journalist.

Biography 
Georgina Frances Whitfield was born on St Vincent in the British West Indies on 15 April 1815. Her father, George Whitfield owned slave plantations in the West Indies.

Georgina married Vicomte Jules de Peyronnet on 3 February 1835 in London.

Georgina worked as a correspondent for The Times during the Franco-Prussian War.

Georgina died on 8 July 1895 at 1 Hyde Park Place in London. She is buried in Kensal Green Cemetery.

References 

19th-century British journalists
1815 births
1895 deaths
The Times journalists